List of National Laboratories (Japan) are scientific research centers in Japan which are encompassed within the community served by the Japan Society for the Promotion of Science (JSPS).

 National Institute of Health and Nutrition.
 National Institute for Land and Infrastructure Management.
 National Research Institute of Police Science, Japan.
 National Institute of Public Health.
 National Center for Child Health and Development.
 National Institute of Science and Technology Policy.
 Policy Research Institute, Ministry of Agriculture, Forestry and Fisheries (Japan)
 National Institute for Minamata Disease.
 National Research Institute of Fire and Disaster.
 National Institute for Longevity Sciences (NCGG).
 Meteorological Research Institute, JMA.
 National Cancer Center.
 National Center of Neurology and Psychiatry (NCNP).
 National Institute of Infectious Diseases
 National Cardiovascular Center.
 Research Institute, National Rehabilitation Center for Persons with Disabilities.
 International Medical Center of Japan.
 National Institute of Health Sciences.
 Geographical Survey Institute of Japan (Geography & Crustal Dynamics Research Center).
 National Institute of Population and Social Security Research.
 Hydrographic and Oceanographic Department.
 National Institute for Educational Policy Research.

See also
 List of Independent Administrative Institutions (Japan)

References

National Laboratories
National Laboratories
Lists of research institutes